Herpetogramma tominagai is a moth in the family Crambidae. It was described by Hiroshi Yamanaka in 2003. It is found in Japan.

The larvae feed on Achyranthes aspera var. rubrofusa.

References

Moths described in 2003
Herpetogramma
Moths of Japan